The 1972–73 NCAA University Division men's basketball season began in November 1972, progressed through the regular season and conference tournaments, and concluded with the 1973 NCAA University Division basketball tournament championship game on March 26, 1973, at St. Louis Arena in St. Louis, Missouri. The UCLA Bruins won their ninth NCAA national championship with an 87–66 victory over the Memphis State Tigers.

Rule changes 
 Freshmen became eligible to play on varsity teams. Previously, they had played on separate freshman teams.
 The free throw on a common foul for the first six personal fouls in a half was eliminated. Instead, the team that was fouled threw the ball in from out of bounds after each  such foul.
 A "flop" — an unnecessary fall to the floor to get a charging call against a player dribbling the ball — was deemed a form of unsportsmanlike conduct.

Season headlines 

 UCLA went undefeated (30–0) for the second straight season and won its seventh NCAA championship in a row, ninth overall, and ninth in 10 seasons. In the Pacific 8 Conference, it also won its seventh of what would ultimately be 13 consecutive conference titles.
 This was the last season for the NCAA University Division as the subdivision of the NCAA made up of colleges and universities competing at the highest level of college sports, as well as for the NCAA College Division for colleges and universities competing at a lower level. After the season, the NCAA replaced the University Division with Division I and the College Division with Division II for schools awarding limited athletic scholarships and Division III for schools offering no athletic scholarships.

Season outlook

Pre-season polls 

The Top 20 from the AP Poll and Coaches Poll during the pre-season.

Conference membership changes

Regular season

Conference winners and tournaments

Informal championships

Statistical leaders

Post-season tournaments

NCAA tournament

Final Four 

 Third Place – Indiana 97, Providence 79

National Invitation tournament

Semifinals & finals 

 Third Place – North Carolina 88, Alabama 69

Awards

Consensus All-American teams

Major player of the year awards 

 Naismith Award: Bill Walton, UCLA
 Helms Player of the Year: Bill Walton, UCLA
 Associated Press Player of the Year: Bill Walton, UCLA
 UPI Player of the Year: Bill Walton, UCLA
 Oscar Robertson Trophy (USBWA): Bill Walton, UCLA
 Adolph Rupp Trophy: Bill Walton, UCLA
 Sporting News Player of the Year: Bill Walton, UCLA

Major coach of the year awards 

 Associated Press Coach of the Year: John Wooden, UCLA
 Henry Iba Award (USBWA): John Wooden, UCLA
 NABC Coach of the Year: Gene Bartow, Memphis State
 UPI Coach of the Year: John Wooden, UCLA
 Sporting News Coach of the Year: John Wooden, UCLA

Other major awards 

 Frances Pomeroy Naismith Award (Best player under 6'0): Robert Sherwin, Army
 Robert V. Geasey Trophy (Top player in Philadelphia Big 5): Tom Ingelsby, Villanova
 NIT/Haggerty Award (Top player in New York City metro area): Billy Schaeffer, St. John's

Coaching changes 

A number of teams changed coaches during the season and after it ended.

References